Drion may refer to:

 Huib Drion (1917-2004), Dutch Supreme Court judge
 Drion's pill, hypothetical suicide tablet